John A. W. Bird (6 February 1926 – 18 November 1997) was a British politician who served as Member of the European Parliament (MEP).

Early life
Born in Wolverhampton, Bird trained as an engineer. He served in the infantry in the British Army during the Second World War, and later lectured in Wolverhampton Polytechnic.

Politics
Bird was a longtime trade unionist. As leader of City of Wolverhampton Council, he spearheaded a 1986 financial rescue of Wolverhampton Wanderers F.C.

Bird was elected to the European Parliament in a 1987 by-election, representing Midlands West.

References

1926 births
1997 deaths
Labour Party (UK) MEPs
MEPs for England 1984–1989
MEPs for England 1989–1994
Councillors in Wolverhampton
Labour Party (UK) councillors
Academics of the University of Wolverhampton